John Fritz Richter (March 12, 1937 – March 1, 1983) was an American basketball player. He attended Frankford High School in Philadelphia.

A 6'9" forward from North Carolina State University, Richter played one season (1959–60) in the NBA as a member of the Boston Celtics.  He averaged 4.3 points per game and earned an NBA Championship ring when the Celtics defeated the St. Louis Hawks in the 1960 NBA Finals.

Following his NBA career, Richter moved to the Eastern Basketball Association playing for the Sunbury Mercuries in Sunbury, Pennsylvania. Richter possessed a formidable hook shot and was frequently one of the EBA's top rebounders.

External links
Career statistics

1937 births
1983 deaths
All-American college men's basketball players
American men's basketball players
Basketball players from Philadelphia
Boston Celtics draft picks
Boston Celtics players
NC State Wolfpack men's basketball players
Power forwards (basketball)